Peda Jalari Peta or Jalaripeta is a popular residential area in the city of Visakhapatnam. VUDA Park is beside this area.

Transport

APSRTC routes

Book on the Jalari Community:

The cultural dialectics of knowledge and desire by Charles William Nuckolls

References

Neighbourhoods in Visakhapatnam